John Oliver Barres (born September 20, 1960) is an American prelate of the Roman Catholic Church, who has been serving as the bishop of the Diocese of Rockville Centre in New York State since January 2017. He previously served as bishop of the Diocese of Allentown in Pennsylvania from 2009 to 2017.

Early life and education
The fifth of six children, John Barres was born on September 20, 1960, to Oliver and Marjorie (née Catchpole) Barres in Larchmont, New York. His parents were Brethren ministers who met each other at Yale Divinity School and then converted to Catholicism in 1955. Oliver Barres wrote about their conversion in the book One Shepherd, One Flock. John Barres was baptized by Archbishop Fulton J. Sheen.

John Barres attended Phillips Academy in Andover, Massachusetts, before entering at Princeton University In Princeton, New Jersey, here he obtained a Bachelor of English Literature degree.  He then attended the New York University School of Business Administration in New York City, earning a Master of Business Administration degree in management (1984). Barres received a Bachelor of Sacred Theology degree in 1988, and a Licentiate in Systematic Theology from the Catholic University of America in Washington, D.C. and received his seminary formation at its theological college.

Ordination and ministry
Barres was ordained to the priesthood for the Diocese of Wilmington by Bishop Robert Mulvee on October 21, 1989. He served as an associate pastor at Holy Family Parish in Newark, Delaware, until 1992, and at St. Elizabeth Parish in Wilmington, Delaware, from 1992 to 1996. He went to the Pontifical University of the Holy Cross in Rome, where he earned a Licentiate of Canon Law in 1998 and a Doctor of Spirituality degree in 1999; his thesis was entitled "Jean-Jacques Olier's Priestly Spirituality: Mental Prayer and Virtue as the Foundation for the Direction of Souls."

Upon his return to Delaware in 1999, Barres became vice chancellor for the diocese. In 2000, he was named chancellor by the bishop and a chaplain to his holiness by the Vatican. In 2005, Barres was named by the Vatican as an honorary prelate. He served on various diocesan boards and committees, as well as the administrative board of the Maryland Catholic Conference, the board of St. Francis Hospital in Wilmington, and the board of the Cathedral Foundation. In addition to his duties as chancellor, Barres briefly became pastor of Holy Child Parish in Wilmington in May 2009.

Barres is a member of Opus Dei.  In addition to his native English, he is fluent in Italian, French, and Spanish.

Bishop of Allentown

On May 27, 2009, Barres was appointed the fourth bishop of the Diocese of Allentown by Pope Benedict XVI, succeeding Bishop Edward Cullen. Barres received his episcopal consecration on July 30, 2009, at the Cathedral of St. Catharine of Siena in Allentown. Cardinal Justin Rigali was the principal consecrator, with Bishop W. Francis Malooly and Bishop Emeritus Michael Saltarelli as principal co-consecrators.

Barres was the first diocesan bishop of the Diocese of Allentown who had not served previously in the Archdiocese of Philadelphia. Barres established the Saint Thomas More Society for lawyers in the diocese and expanded the diocese's Hispanic ministry and evangelization.

Bishop of Rockville Centre
Pope Francis appointed  Barres as bishop of the Diocese of Rockville Centre on December 9, 2016. He was installed on January 31, 2017 at the Cathedral of Saint Agnes. In October 2017, Barres announced the creation of the Independent Reconciliation and Compensation Program (IRCP) for survivors of acts of child sexual abuse committed by clergy in the diocese. Barres serves on the Committee on Evangelization and Catechesis of the United States Conference of Catholic Bishops (USCCB). In 2017, Barres created with Telecare, the diocesan television network, a video series targeted to commuters, entitled "The Catholic Spirituality of Commuter Delays."

In August 2018, a Pennsylvania grand jury report criticized Barres for failing to remove a priest from the ministry after credible allegations of sexual misconduct while he was bishop in the Diocese of Allentown. In 2009, the diocese received a report from a man who alleged that Michael Lawrence, a diocese priest, had "fondled his genitals" when he was age 13. Lawrence, who had admitted to sexually abusing a 12-year-old boy in 1982, had previously been sent to a monitored rural facility for sex offenders. In 2002, Lawrence retired from pastoral work. At some point, Barres considered having Lawrence laicized.  However, according to a spokesperson for the diocese, Barres finally decided: "... to withdraw the application to remove Lawrence from the clerical state out of concern that if they did, he may leave the supervised, secure facility and re-enter society, where he might be a danger to children. 'Bishop Barres stands by his decision'".A second case mentioned in the Pennsylvania grand jury report involved Thomas J. Benestad, a monsignor in the Diocese of Allentown. A 2011 accusation stated that Benestad forced a boy in the 1980's to perform oral sex on him, then later he performed oral sex on the boy. According to the grand jury report "... the Diocese reported the allegation to the Northampton County District Attorney's office, which ... found the victim's allegations to be credible." No charges were filed because the statute of limitations had expired. A response from Barres to the grand jury report regarding the handling of the Lawrence and Benestad cases was posted online.

See also

 Catholic Church hierarchy
 Catholic Church in the United States
 Historical list of the Catholic bishops of the United States
 List of the Catholic bishops of the United States
 Lists of patriarchs, archbishops, and bishops

References

External links 
The Roman Catholic Diocese of Rockville Centre Official Site

1960 births
Living people
People from Larchmont, New York
Phillips Academy alumni
Princeton University alumni
Princeton Tigers men's basketball players
New York University Stern School of Business alumni
Catholic University of America alumni
Roman Catholic Diocese of Wilmington
Roman Catholic bishops in Pennsylvania
21st-century Roman Catholic bishops in the United States
Roman Catholic Diocese of Allentown
Roman Catholic Ecclesiastical Province of Philadelphia
American men's basketball players